David Bates (March 6, 1809 – January 25, 1870) was an American poet.

He was born in Indian Hill, Ohio, and educated in Buffalo, New York, before working in first Indianapolis then Philadelphia.  In 1849, he published a volume of poetry, Eolian.

Among his best-known works are "Speak Gently", which was parodied by Lewis Carroll in Alice's Adventures in Wonderland, as well as "Chiding", and "Childhood".

He started his adult life as a lowly clerk but, through hard work and determination, made his way in the business and eventually became a full member and chief buyer for an Indianapolis mercantile house. Apart from that Bates had a talent for writing easy going, gentle poetry and, at the age of 40, he had a collection of poems published under the title Eolian. One of the best known poems in this collection – Speak Gently – has become something of a universal hymn for people all over the world.

1809 births
1870 deaths
Poets from Ohio
19th-century American poets
American male poets
19th-century American male writers